Alister Howden (20 August 1877 – 25 November 1938) was a New Zealand cricketer. He played first-class cricket for Auckland between 1906 and 1914.

Life and career
Alister Howden was born in Scotland and moved to New Zealand with his family as a boy. After attending Otago Boys' High School he worked for the Bank of Australasia in Invercargill before taking other positions in financial institutions in New Zealand. He went into business as a grain and produce merchant in Auckland in the 1900s.

In 1908-09 Howden took 7 for 87 and 5 for 61 with his leg-spin to help Auckland retain the Plunket Shield against Otago, dismissing his brother Charles in each innings. In January 1910, after Howden had taken six wickets against Canterbury and eight against Wellington to help Auckland retain the Shield, an Auckland cricket writer said: "it is the opinion of many experts that he is without exception the best bowler in New Zealand at present". He was selected in the first of the two matches New Zealand played against Australia later that season, but had no success.

He was also an accomplished golfer who won several local championships.

He died in November 1938, survived by his wife and four sons. He left an estate worth 11,000 pounds.

See also
 List of Auckland representative cricketers

References

External links
 
 

1877 births
1938 deaths
Auckland cricketers
Cricketers from Rothesay, Bute
New Zealand cricketers
People educated at Otago Boys' High School
Pre-1930 New Zealand representative cricketers
Scottish emigrants to New Zealand